Ilianen is a Manobo language of Mindanao in the Philippines.

Distribution and dialects
Ilianen is spoken in the following areas:
North Cotabato Province: north and central watershed of Mindanao river
Bukidnon Province: Kandingilan, Kibawe, and Darnulong municipalities
Maguindanao Province: northern tips of both Northern Kambutalan and Datu Montawal municipalities

Its dialects are Arakan, Livunganen, and Pulangiyan.

References

Manobo languages
Languages of Cotabato
Languages of Bukidnon